The Aéro Services Guépard Super Guépard SG 12 (English: Super Cheetah) is a French ultralight aircraft that was designed and produced by Aéro Services Guépard by of Villefranche-de-Rouergue. The aircraft is supplied as a complete ready-to-fly-aircraft.

Design and development
The aircraft was designed to comply with the Fédération Aéronautique Internationale microlight rules. It features a cantilever single-strut-braced high-wing, a two-seats-in-side-by-side configuration enclosed cabin with doors, fixed tricycle landing gear and a single engine in tractor configuration.

The aircraft is made from welded steel tubing with its wings made from aluminum sheet. The standard engine used is the  Rotax 912ULS four-stroke powerplant.

Operational history
Reviewer Marino Boric described the design of the welded steel tube fuselage in a 2015 review as assuring "good protection for the crew".

Specifications (Super Guépard SG 12)

References

External links

Aéro Services Guépard aircraft
2000s French civil utility aircraft
2000s French ultralight aircraft
Light-sport aircraft
Single-engined tractor aircraft